Ormiston Pound is a ring of mountains in the Northern Territory of Australia punctuating the MacDonnell Ranges, in the West MacDonnell National Park, approximately  west of Alice Springs.  It lies at roughly the halfway point in the Larapinta Trail and has views from its circumference of Mount Sonder, Gosses Bluff crater and the surrounding range.

The Pound, a ring of mountains, is dominated by Mount Giles, which forms its eastern boundary.  The western boundary is formed by the Ormiston Gorge, a popular tourist destination.

The pound is accessible from a road in the west, which travels between Glen Helen and Alice Springs.  There is a waterhole at the bottom near the gorge, as well as several lookouts.  The entire pound encompasses .  The Finke River passes Ormiston Gorge in the west.

See also

West MacDonnell National Park
Larapinta Trail

References

External links
Google Maps Satellite image

Panorama

Mountains of the Northern Territory